Freisen is a municipality in the district of Sankt Wendel, in Saarland, Germany. It is situated approximately 12 km northeast of Sankt Wendel, and 20 km southwest of Idar-Oberstein. The public transportation in Freisen/Oberkirchen is through bus and connects to other towns via transfers in Sankt Wendel and Neunkirchen.

References

Sankt Wendel (district)